The following is a list of spiders of Pakistan.

Species list

Family Araneidae
Genus Argiope
Argiope australis - found in
Dadu, Pakistan (August 2022)

Family Eresidae
Genus Stegodyphus
Stegodyphus pacificus - found in Peshawar (1984)
Stegodyphus sarasinorum  - found in Lahore (1935) and in Faisalabad, Okara and Sialkot (1997)

Family Hersiliidae
Genus Hersilia
Hersilia savignyi - found in Leiah, Okara and Sahiwal (1997)

Family Oecobiidae
Genus Uroctea
Uroctea matthaii - Found in some houses of Faisalabad (1996)

Family Oonopidae
Genus Opopaea
Opopaea batanguena - found in Faisalabad (1996)

Family Pholcidae
Genus Crossopriza
Crossopriza lyoni - found in Okara (1996) and Faisalabad (1998)

Family Salticidae
Genus Habrocestum
Habrocestum  coecatus (or Habronattus coronatum) - found in Faisalabad (1996) and Leiah (1998)
Genus Hyllus
Hyllus bengalensis (previously Phidippus bengalensis) - found in many localities of Punjab
Hyllus semicupreus (previously Phidippus indicus) - found in various localities of Punjab
Genus Marpissa
Marpissa anusuae - found in various localities of Punjab
Marpissa decorata - found in Faisalabad, Khanewal, Rawalpindi and Vehari (1997)
Marpissa muscosa - found in Faisalabad, Sahiwal, Leiah and Jhang (1998)
Marpissa tigrina - found in many localities of Punjab
Genus Myrmarachne
Myrmarachne bengalensis - found in Faisalabad and Sheikhupura (1998)
Myrmarachne laeta - found in Faisalabad (1996)
Myrmarachne maratha - found in many localities of Punjab
Myrmarachne orientales - found in many localities of Punjab
Genus Phintella
Phintella vittata (previously Salticus ranjitus) - found in many localities of Punjab
Genus Phlegra
Phlegra dhakuriensis - found in many localities of Punjab
Genus Plexippus
Plexippus calcutaensis (also Plexippus bengalensis) - found in Faisalabad (1998)
Plexippus paykulli - found in many localities of Punjab
Genus Rhene
Rhene danieli - found in Faisalabad (1997)
Rhene decorata - found in Faisalabad and Vehari (1997)
Rhene indica - found in Faisalabad (1997)
Genus Telamonia
Telamonia dimidiata (previously Phidippus pateli) - found in many localities of Punjab
Genus Thiania
Thiania aura - found in Faisalabad (1997) and Khanewal (1998)
Genus Thyene
Thyene imperialis (previously Phidippus punjabensis) - found in various localities of central Punjab

Family Scytodidae
Genus Scytodes
Scytodes thoracica - found in Faisalabad (1996)

Family Uloboridae
Genus Uloborus
Uloborus plumipes - found in Lahore (1935) and Faisalabad, Jhang, Khanewal and Layyah (1996)

See also
List of butterflies of Pakistan

References

Pakistan Research Repository - Spiders of Pakistan

Further reading
A checklist of spider of Punjab, Pakistan - University of Agriculture, Faisalabad

Spiders
Spiders
Pakistan
Pakistan